Emilia Strong Sykes (born January 4, 1986) is an American politician who is the U.S. representative for Ohio's 13th congressional district. She formerly represented the 34th district of the Ohio House of Representatives, which consists of portions of the Akron area. From 2019 until 2021, she also served as minority leader of that chamber.

Biography
Sykes grew up in the Akron area and is the daughter of former state representatives Vernon Sykes (now an Ohio state senator) and Barbara Sykes, who successively held the same seat from 1982 to 2014. Between Vernon, Barbara, and Emilia, the Sykes family held the seat for 40 years.

Sykes holds a Bachelor of Arts in psychology from Kent State University. She received a JD from the University of Florida Levin College of Law and a Master of Public Health from the College of Public Health and Health Professions.

She previously attended Tuskegee University, where she filed a lawsuit against the university after it mistakenly honored her as the winner of the Miss Tuskegee University beauty pageant in 2006 and revoked her title after correcting it.

Sykes has served as an administrative adviser in the Summit County fiscal office. In 2013, she ran for the Ohio House of Representatives to succeed her father, Vernon, who was term-limited. She defeated Summit County Councilman Frank Communale to secure the Democratic nomination, and Republican nominee Cynthia Blake 72%-28% in the general election.

In 2015, Sykes and fellow Democratic lawmaker Greta Johnson introduced a bill that sought to exempt feminine hygiene products from sales tax.

In 2019, Sykes was elected the leader of the Democrats in the Ohio House, becoming minority leader.

During the 2020 Democratic Party presidential primaries, Sykes supported Joe Biden.

Sykes won the EMILY's List 2020 Gabby Giffords Rising Star Award.

U.S. House of Representatives

Elections

2022 

In January 2022, Sykes announced her candidacy for Ohio's 13th congressional district.

In November 2022, she won the general election, defeating Republican nominee Madison Gesiotto Gilbert, a former Miss Ohio USA.

Tenure

COVID-19 policy
On January 31, 2023, Sykes voted against H.R.497:Freedom for Health Care Workers Act, a bill which would lift COVID-19 vaccine mandates for healthcare workers.

On February 1, 2023, Sykes voted against a resolution to end COVID-19 national emergency.

Syria
In 2023, Sykes voted against H.Con.Res. 21 which directed President Joe Biden to remove U.S. troops from Syria within 180 days.

Voting rights
On February 9, 2023, Sykes voted against H.J.Res. 24: Disapproving the action of the District of Columbia Council in approving the Local Resident Voting Rights Amendment Act of 2022 which condemns the District of Columbia’s plan that would allow noncitizens to vote in local elections.

Caucus memberships 

Congressional Equality Caucus
Congressional Black Caucus
 New Democrat Coalition

Committee assignments 

 Committee on Transportation and Infrastructure
 Subcommittee on Water Resources and Environment (vice ranking member)

Electoral history

References

External links

 Congresswoman Emilia Sykes official U.S. House website
 Emilia Sykes for Congress campaign website

 

|-

|-

|-

1986 births
20th-century African-American people
20th-century African-American women
21st-century African-American women
21st-century African-American politicians
21st-century American politicians
21st-century American women politicians
African-American members of the United States House of Representatives
African-American state legislators in Ohio
African-American women in politics
Democratic Party members of the Ohio House of Representatives
Democratic Party members of the United States House of Representatives from Ohio
Female members of the United States House of Representatives
Fredric G. Levin College of Law alumni
Kent State University alumni
Left-wing populism in the United States
Living people
Politicians from Akron, Ohio
Women state legislators in Ohio